Ceryx evar is a moth of the  subfamily Arctiinae. It was described by Pagenstecher in 1886. It is found on Ambon Island, Aru and the Key Islands.

References

Ceryx (moth)
Moths described in 1886